August Williams may refer to:

Gus Williams (outfielder) (1888–1964), American baseball player
August Getty (born 1994), American fashion designer

See also
Augustine Williams (disambiguation)
Gus Williams (disambiguation)